Cabo Corrientes is a cape on the Guanahacabibes Peninsula in Pinar del Río Province, in the west of Cuba.
It is covered by a protected nature reserve. The cape has been the scene of various pirate encounters and shipwrecks. 
During World War II (1939–45) several ships were sunk near the cape.
There is a hotel for researchers and ecotourists or scuba divers.

Location
The cape extends from the south of the Guanahacabibes Peninsula, to the east of the Bahia de Corrientes.
It is covered in dense forest and jagged rocks.
A road runs along the bay to the village of Maria la Gorda.
Since 1963 the cape has been strictly protected by the Cabo Corrientes Nature Reserve, which since 2001 has been part of the  Guanahacabibes National Park, in turn part of the  Peninsula de Guanahacabibes Biosphere Reserve.
The cape is brushed or hit by a tropical storm on average every 2.27 years, and hit by hurricane-force winds every 5.58 years.

History

The peninsula was one of the last places of refuge for indigenous people who escaped from the Spanish, and has almost 140 archeological sites.

In early 1591 an English fleet had been organised for a raiding expedition to the Spanish West Indies, which became known as the Blockade of Western Cuba or Watts' West Indies Expedition.
The English took up position near Cabo Corrientes in mid June 1591 to await the arrival of Spanish ships.
On 23 June Burr, Hopewell, Swallow and Content arrived between Cape Corrientes and Cape San Antonio and soon sighted six sail.
Hoping these were treasure ships, the English closed, only to discover the ships were a powerful Spanish naval force. 
A three-hour engagement followed after which the English formation scattered.

On 29 June Hopewell and Swallow returned to Cape Corrientes to find no sign of any Spanish ships.  
On 3 July while part of the formation was watering inshore off Corrientes, Pegasus and Centaur caught sight of a number of Spanish ships. 
After a quick pursuit they overhauled and captured the 150 ton Spanish armed merchantmen Santa Catalina under Captain Martín Francisco de Armendáriz and the 100 ton escorting frigata Regalo de Dios. At the same time the other escorting frigata was trapped and captured by Lion and Swallow. 
The Spanish ships had been bound from Santo Domingo to Havana carrying valuables which included precious stones and hides.
On 5 July, the English agreed to all sail together with their prizes until they passed the Cuban capital.

The Preston Somers Expedition reached Cabo Corrientes on the 22 July 1595, and there decided to perform a short blockade off Havana in the attempt to make a few small prizes.
There is a story that the treasures of the Catedral de Mérida were buried somewhere on the cape in the mid-17th century.
Two men, one at the end of the 19th century and the other around 1930 are said to have each returned from the cape with a handful of gold, claiming they had found the buried treasure. Both died before they could return to excavate the treasure.
People continue to search for the trove.

Very few people live on the cape apart from a few scientists studying the environment and some ecotourists.
There is a hotel in Maria la Gorda that may be used by scuba divers.

Shipwrecks

Notes

Sources

 

Corrientes
Sandino, Cuba
Geography of Pinar del Río Province